Bosom Buddies is an American television sitcom starring Tom Hanks and Peter Scolari created by Robert L. Boyett, Thomas L. Miller and Chris Thompson (Miller-Milkis-Boyett Productions). It aired on Thursday nights for two seasons on ABC from November 27, 1980, to March 27, 1982, and in reruns in the summer of 1984 on NBC. The show features the misadventures of two single men, working in creative advertising, struggling in their industry while disguising themselves as women in order to live in the one apartment they could afford. Gender stereotypes and male/female interpersonal relationships were frequent themes.

The show became known for its quirky humor and its frequent use of improvisation, especially between stars Hanks and Scolari. Though the show started out with good ratings, it failed to hold the public's interest and was canceled after two seasons.

Premise

In the pilot episode, after their own apartment is demolished while they are still asleep in it, two men disguise themselves as women in order to live in the dirt-cheap Susan B. Anthony Hotel, which happens to be female-only.  Kip Wilson (Hanks) is originally skeptical of the plan, but after meeting gorgeous resident model/dancer/nurse Sonny Lumet (Donna Dixon), he ends up convincing aspiring writer Henry Desmond (Scolari) that the experience will make a great book. Their co-worker, Amy Cassidy (Wendie Jo Sperber), who is attracted to Henry, is the only resident in on the plan. The boys’ deception includes outwitting the hotel manager, Darlene (Edie Adams), and fellow resident, Isabelle Hammond (Telma Hopkins), an aspiring singer. When the pilot sold to ABC, the character of Darlene was replaced by Lilly Sinclair (Lucille Benson).

In the first season, Kip, Henry, and Amy work for Ruth Dunbar (Holland Taylor) at the Manhattan-based advertising firm of Livingston, Gentry & Mishkin, where Kip is a graphic artist, Henry is a copy writer, and Amy is the receptionist. Ruth often takes credit for the boys’ work when reporting to her (unseen) boss, Mr. Rubinowitz.

The show was barely renewed for a second season. In order to improve the mediocre ratings of the first season, revise the format, and at the same time, do some cost-cutting, it was decided that the part of Lilly Sinclair was superfluous and was written out. As a result, veteran actress Lucille Benson left the series and Telma Hopkins' character of Isabelle became the new hotel manager. Kip, Henry and Amy left Livingston, Gentry & Mishkin to start their own advertising firm, Sixty Seconds Street, with Ruth serving as a not-quite silent partner.

In the first episode of the second season, the male characters’ ruse of living in drag is revealed, but they are allowed to continue living at the women-only hotel anyway. Sonny forgives Kip for the deception, and Isabelle, the new hotel manager, agrees to go along with the ruse rather than admit it to the other residents. From this point on, the drag element was de-emphasized and the show moved closer to the creators' original concept of a regular buddy comedy.

Cast
 Tom Hanks as Kip Wilson / Buffy (when in drag)
 Peter Scolari as Henry Desmond / Hildegard (when in drag)
 Wendie Jo Sperber as Amy Cassidy, co-worker and friend who knows their secret
 Holland Taylor as Ruth Dunbar, their boss
 Donna Dixon as Sonny Lumet, Kip's love interest and hotel resident
 Telma Hopkins as Isabelle Hammond, hotel resident; hotel manager in season 2
 Lucille Benson as Lilly Sinclair, hotel manager (season 1)

Production
The series was conceived by Miller and Boyett as a male counterpart to their hit sitcom Laverne & Shirley. They originally pitched it as a straightforward buddy comedy done in what they described as "a sophisticated Billy Wilder kind of way." When ABC executives asked Miller and Boyett to explain what they meant by the comparison to Wilder, the producers mentioned Some Like It Hot and ABC bought the show on condition that it would include men in women's clothing, just like that movie. "We weren't there to pitch that," Miller recalled. "And they jumped on it! We drove back to the studio in the car saying, 'Oh my God, what are we gonna do? We have to do something in drag.'"

After the cast had been chosen, Miller and Boyett asked Chris Thompson, one of the writer-producers of Laverne & Shirley, to write the pilot and be the series showrunner. Thompson (who would go on to executive-produce such shows as The Larry Sanders Show) said later that he took the job purely for the money, but unexpectedly found it to be "my completely favorite experience in show business", because the network left him and his young cast free to experiment. "We were left alone," he recalled. "Nobody was paying attention to us. We were all really young, but it was like we had daddy's Porsche. We had $500,000 to play with every week."

Bosom Buddies was taped on Stage 25 at Paramount Pictures.  Stage 25 was also the home of The Lucy Show, Cheers, and its spin-off Frasier.

Like many other sitcoms that aired during the 1980–81 television season, Bosom Buddies felt the effects of a strike by the Screen Actors Guild and American Federation of Television and Radio Artists that occurred in 1980. As a result, the show had an abbreviated first season. At first, its ratings were strong. However, ABC kept switching the show's day and time slots, which hurt the first season's overall standing. The second season, with its revised premise, fared even worse, and after more time slot changes by the network, the show was canceled in the spring of 1982.

Bosom Buddies was one of the last shows to use the Miller-Milkis-Boyett production team due to Eddie Milkis leaving the company in 1984. This was also one of the last Miller-Boyett sitcoms to be produced by Paramount Television (now CBS Television Studios) before they moved their base of operations to Lorimar Productions (later Warner Bros. Television); Happy Days ended its run in 1984, making the latter the last program to meet cancellation before the Miller-Boyett move to Lorimar, with Valerie being the first since to debut.

Episodes
While the pilot episode was shot on film, the rest of the series was shot on videotape.

Season 1 (1980–81)

Season 2 (1981–82)

Theme song
The theme song for the opening credits was Billy Joel's "My Life", although it was a re-recorded version with Gary Bennett as the vocalist and Mike Lucas on piano. Some reruns shown in syndication (such as when USA Network aired reruns, as well as its later runs on MeTV) and all home video and DVD releases use a vocal version of the show's end credit instrumental theme, "Shake Me Loose", performed by Stephanie Mills, for the opening credits, replacing "My Life".

Reruns
NBC briefly aired reruns of Bosom Buddies in the summer of 1984, after the successes of Splash and Bachelor Party had made Hanks a major film star. Ratings were good, but there was no possibility of Hanks returning for a revival of the show. Reruns also aired on the USA Network until November 18, 1995, as well as on TBS and TV Land until the mid-2000s. More recently, Weigel Broadcasting has aired the series on some of its networks, including MeTV, MeTV Plus, and Decades.

In the U.K., Bosom Buddies was aired by Two ITV Companies LWT and TSW in the early 80s. The Paramount Channel, Also repeated the series from November 1, 1995, until February 4, 2001.

Home media
CBS DVD (distributed by Paramount) released both seasons of Bosom Buddies on Region 1 DVD. The original theme song "My Life" by Billy Joel was replaced with "Shake Me Loose", a song penned by show creator Chris Thompson, which was used during the show's syndication run. Many of the musical numbers featured during the show's run are edited or eliminated altogether from the DVD releases. Notable in this vein are the songs "Yakkity Yak" (from the episode "Call Me Irresponsible"), "Chances Are" (from "All You Need is Love") and "Rock and Roll Heaven" (from "Hildy's Dirt Nap").

On February 6, 2018, CBS Home Entertainment released Bosom Buddies- The Complete Series on DVD in Region 1.

Pop culture references
A shot-for-shot remake of the show's opening credits aired January 23, 2014, on Adult Swim as an installment of Parks and Recreation star Adam Scott's The Greatest Event in Television History. The parody was directed by Lance Bangs and Scott and features Paul Rudd playing the part of Tom Hanks' character Kip, and Scott playing Peter Scolari's character Henry. The theme song "My Life" by Billy Joel is actually sung by Joel instead of the sound-alike version used for the original TV series. In an extended mock "making-of" documentary preceding the opening credits remake, Hanks, Scolari, and Joel make cameo appearances. In Season 5 Episode 20 of the NBC comedy 30 Rock, Hanks makes a cameo appearance wherein he references Bosom Buddies by singing lines from that show's theme song, "My Life".

See also
 Cross-dressing in film and television
 Three's Company (1977)
 Tootsie (1982)

References

External links
 
 

1980s American sitcoms
1980 American television series debuts
1980s American workplace comedy television series
1982 American television series endings
American Broadcasting Company original programming
Cross-dressing in television
English-language television shows
Fictional duos
Television duos
Television series by CBS Studios
Television shows set in New York City